"Bamboo Houses" is a song by Japanese musician-composer Ryuichi Sakamoto and English singer-songwriter David Sylvian, released on Virgin Records in 1982.  It reached number 30 in the UK charts in the second week of August 1982.

The double A-side single "Bamboo Houses"/"Bamboo Music" was the first solo project by Sylvian, released while he was still a member of the band Japan. It was the second collaboration between the two, the first being the track "Taking Islands in Africa" on the 1980 Japan album Gentlemen Take Polaroids which featured Sakamoto on keyboards. The "Bamboo Houses" single in turn featured drums by Japan member Steve Jansen, who also appeared in the promo video, and was co-produced by Steve Nye. Similarly, Sakamoto was still a member of the band Yellow Magic Orchestra at the time, though he had already done some previous solo work.

In 1983 Sylvian and Sakamoto would team up again on "Forbidden Colours", the theme song to the Nagisa Oshima film Merry Christmas, Mr. Lawrence, along with several other projects in later years.

A remix of "Bamboo Houses" was included on David Sylvian's career retrospective Everything and Nothing in 2000 and A Victim of Stars 1982–2012 in 2012.

Track listings
Composed and arranged by Ryuichi Sakamoto and David Sylvian

 UK 7" single with gatefold sleeve, Virgin Records VS 510
 "Bamboo Houses" (7" Edit) – 4:13
 "Bamboo Music" (7" Edit) – 4:40

 UK 12", Virgin Records VS 510-12
 "Bamboo Houses" – 5:26
 "Bamboo Music" – 5:38

Chart positions

Personnel
 Ryuichi Sakamoto – keyboards, programming, MC4, marimba, spoken word (on "Bamboo Houses")
 David Sylvian – keyboards, programming, vocals
 Steve Jansen – percussion instruments, electronic percussion

Production
 Ryuichi Sakamoto – producer
 David Sylvian – producer, mix, cover design & layout
 Steve Nye – producer, sound engineer, mix
 Yasushi Handa – cover photography
 Yoshi Ueda – cover photography

References

External links
Bamboo Music – Promo video for Bamboo Music.

1982 singles
Songs written by David Sylvian
Songs written by Ryuichi Sakamoto
1982 songs
Virgin Records singles